Harju is a Finnish surname. Notable people with the surname include:

Arsi Harju (born 1974), Finnish shot putter
Beata Harju (born 1990), Finnish voice actress
Johan Harju (born 1986), Swedish ice hockey player
Juha Harju (born 1981), Finnish heavy metal musician

Finnish-language surnames